The 79th National Guard Higher Command is a Hellenic Army mechanized infantry brigade responsible for the defense of the island of Samos.

Structure 
  79th National Guard Higher Command (79η ΑΔΤΕ), based at Samos
 HQ Company (ΛΣΤ/79 ΑΔΤΕ)
 79th National Guard Armored Battalion (79 ΕΑΡΜΕΘ)
 649th National Guard Infantry Battalion (649 ΤΠ)
 239th National Guard Mechanized Battalion (239 M/K ΤΕ)
 298th National Guard Mechanized Battalion (298 M/K ΤΕ)
 164th National Guard Artillery Battalion (164 ΤΕ)
 79th National Guard Artillery Battalion (79 TE)
 79th National Guard Air Defense Battalion (79 ΜΕΘ)
 79th National Guard Engineer Battalion (79 ΤΜΧΕΘ)
 79th National Guard Medical Battalion (79 ΤΥΕΘ)
 79th National Guard Anti Τank Company (79 ΛΑΤΕΘ)
 79th National Guard Signal Company (79 ΛΔΒΕΘ)
 79th National Guard Support Battalion (79 ΤΥΠΕΘ)
 Αgios Kyrikos Home Guard Battalion (TE Αγ Κυρηκου)
 Samos Home Guard Battalion (ΤΕ Σαμου)

1964 establishments in Greece
Mechanized infantry brigades of Greece
Samos